A twin block is an orthodontic appliance developed by  William J. Clark whose purpose is to lengthen the lower jaw by posturing it forward. If the jaw is growing during treatment, it naturally grows at a faster rate; otherwise the appliance is useless. Treatment time varies, but is generally around 9 months. Twin Blocks can also be used to cure an overbite, which can mean treatment may be slightly longer. If this is the case, treatment can vary from 6 to 11 months.

References

Orthodontic appliances